Serhiy Viktorovych Vasich (born 1971, Batumi, Georgian SSR, USSR - died March 8, 2022, near Makariv village, Kyiv region) - senior sergeant of the Armed Forces of Ukraine, participant in the Russian-Ukrainian war, Hero of Ukraine (posthumously).

Bio
Serhiy Vasich was born into a military family in 1971 in Batumi (Georgia). Together with his parents, he traveled around the Soviet controlled world to military garrisons, so the army was his home. Father is an officer who served in tank troops. Since childhood, Serhiy loved military equipment, especially tanks.

In high school, Serhiy Vasich studied well, and later obtained a technical education. He was a comprehensively developed person, always read a lot and constantly improved his knowledge. After moving to Hrytsevo, he worked in the Hrytsevo Communications Department.

Served in the Armed Forces of Ukraine since 2015. Since 2018, he was a tank commander in the tank battalion of the 14th separate mechanized brigade. Defended Ukrainian positions in the Kyiv region.

Russian invasion of Ukraine 
On 8 March 2022, three tank crews of the 14th Brigade took part in the fight to liberate the city of Makariv from Russian occupiers. Serhiy Vasich, as tankman of the 14th Brigade, managed to shoot a Russian tank from the first shot. One after another the enemy tanks were caught in fire. Russian infantry started to run away, soon they spotted the position of the Ukrainian tankmen, and called for artillery backup. Manoeuvring the Ukrainian's tankmen destroyed the enemy. The tank of senior sergeant Vasich entered occupant's flank and started firing high-explosive shells, kicking out infantry. Together three tank crews destroyed six units of machinery and significant force of enemy power. This allowed them to push back the enemy and during the counterattack the Ukrainian army liberated the urban-type settlement Makariv. However, an enemy anti-tank guided missile hit a Ukrainian T-64BV tank: it detonated ammunition and tore down a turret. The crew of the senior sergeant Serhiy Vasich, the soldier Oleh Svynchuk and the senior soldier  were lost in battle.

Awards

 The title of "Hero of Ukraine" with the Order of the Golden Star (2022, posthumously) — for personal courage and heroism shown in defense of state sovereignty and territorial integrity of Ukraine, loyalty to the military oath.

References

1971 births
2022 deaths
People from Batumi
Ukrainian military personnel killed in the 2022 Russian invasion of Ukraine
Recipients of the title of Hero of Ukraine